Staff Sergeant Mohammad Haizul Rani bin Metusin (born 1 May 1984) is a Bruneian footballer who last played as a defender for MS ABDB of the Brunei Super League. He also made appearances for Brunei's professional club DPMM FC in the 2017 S.League.

His international debut for Brunei came in the 0-5 loss against Indonesia in a friendly on 26 September 2012, replacing Reduan Petara. He played 2 games for the national team in the 2012 AFF Suzuki Cup qualification.

External links

References 

Living people
Association football defenders
Bruneian footballers
Brunei international footballers
DPMM FC players
1984 births
MS ABDB players